How to Swim or how to swim may refer to:

 How to Swim (1945 film), a cartoon by Walt Disney Productions
 How to Swim (2018 film), an Israeli short drama film written and directed by Noa Gusakov
 How to Swim (band), a pop/rock band from Glasgow, United Kingdom
 Ability to swim, the ability in a range of organisms to propel motion through a liquid medium
 Human swimming, the self-propulsion of a person through water for survival, recreation, sport, or exercise
 Swimming (sport), a water based sport